Ralph Schwartz is a money manager on Wall Street. In 2007, he won a World Series of Poker bracelet in the $5,000 H.O.R.S.E. Championship.  H.O.R.S.E. is a variation of poker where the type of poker rotates between limit hold'em, Omaha, Razz, Stud, and Seven card stud Eight or better.

Near the end of the first day, Schwartz was down to about $2,000 in chips and decided that his tournament was over.  Deciding that he'd like to go out with his friends, he started playing super aggressive.

As of 2007, Ralph Schwartz has tournament winning of over $275,000.

World Series of Poker bracelets

References

American poker players
Living people
World Series of Poker bracelet winners
Year of birth missing (living people)